Brighton Centre is a conference and exhibition centre located in Brighton, England. It is the largest of its kind in southern England, and is regularly used for conferences of the British political parties and other bodies of national importance. The venue has the capacity to accommodate up to 5,000 delegates, although rooms in the building can be used for weddings and banquets.

It has also been used as a live music venue since it was opened by James Callaghan on 19 September 1977.  It was designed in a Brutalist style by architects Russell Diplock & Associates, who made extensive use of textured concrete. The venue is situated in the centre of Brighton on the sea front and is within 200 metres of major hotels. In 2004, it was estimated that the centre generates £50 million in revenue for Brighton.

Renovation
The second phase of redevelopment was completed in January 2012; a refurbishment of its main entrance resulted in a transformation of its outside facade. In addition to this, the venue's restaurant, which is regularly used as a relaxation space for larger conferences, now features floor-to-ceiling windows with uninterrupted views of the seafront and new interiors.

As part of Brighton's "City Plan", it has been proposed that the building be knocked down to make way to an extension to the Churchill Square shopping centre.

Notable events 
Bing Crosby's final performance was at the Brighton Centre on 10 October 1977. He died of a heart attack four days later, while at a golf tournament in Spain.

The Jacksons performed on 10 February 1979 as part of their Destiny World Tour.

Bob Marley and The Wailers performed on 8 and 9 July 1980 as part of their Uprising Tour.

Between 1978 and 1995 it was the venue for the Brighton International tennis tournament, an annual event on the WTA Tour. Champions of the event included Chris Evert, Martina Navratilova and Steffi Graf.

On 11 December 1982, The Jam played their last gig in the Conference Room at the Brighton Centre.

From 29 to 30 November 1983, pop duo Wham! performed their final dates on their debut UK tour, titled Club Fantastic Tour.

From 9–15 September 1989, the Liberal Democrats held their first Liberal Democrat Conference, after the party's formation in the previous year.

In 2003 and 2004, it hosted the 2003 and 2004 British Open snooker, from 8–16 November.

On December 17, 2006, comedy rock duo Tenacious D performed as part of their  Pick of Destiny Tour, Neil Hamburger was opening act

References

External links

 

Buildings and structures in Brighton and Hove
Exhibition and conference centres in England
Indoor arenas in England
Darts venues